Stirling was an electoral district of the House of Assembly in the Australian state of South Australia from 1938 to 1970.

Stirling was superseded by the Electoral district of Heysen in a boundary redistribution for the 1970 election. William McAnaney was the first member of the new district.

Members

Election results

References 

Former electoral districts of South Australia
1938 establishments in Australia
1970 disestablishments in Australia